The big naked-backed bat (Pteronotus gymnonotus), is a bat species from South and Central America.

Taxonomy
It was described as a new species in 1843 by German zoologist Johann Andreas Wagner. Wagner placed it in the now-defunct genus Chilonycteris. The holotype had been collected in Cuiabá, Mato Grosso, Brazil. Taxon authority is sometimes given to Johann Natterer, however. According to the International Code of Zoological Nomenclature's Principle of Priority, the first author to publish a species name is considered the authority of that name. Smith (1977) hypothesized that Wagner copied Natterer's species description directly from his diary, and thus gave Natterer the authority. Carter and Dolan (1978) stated that Wagner's description was not comparable to Natterer's, which is why they attribute the name to Wagner. The reference texts Mammals of South America and Mammals of Mexico also list Wagner as the authority.

Description
Instead of attaching to the sides of the bat, its wings attach to its back near its spine. This gives individuals the appearance of having a "naked back" due to the lack of fur on its wings. However, its back is furred under the wings.

Range and habitat
The big naked-backed bat is found in Belize Bolivia, Brazil, Colombia, Costa Rica, Ecuador, El Salvador, Guatemala, Guyana, Honduras, Mexico, Nicaragua, Panama, Peru, and Venezuela. It has only been documented at elevations below .

Conservation
As of 2008, it is evaluated as a least-concern species by the IUCN.

References

Bats of Brazil
Bats of Central America
Bats of South America
Mammals described in 1843
Mammals of Colombia
Mammals of Ecuador
Mammals of Venezuela
Pteronotus
Taxa named by Johann Andreas Wagner